Nellie May Madison (née Mooney) (April 5, 1895–July 8, 1953) was an American woman who was convicted of murder in 1934 for killing her husband. She was the first woman to be sentenced to death in the state of California. Due to public outcry, her sentence was later commuted to life in prison and she was eventually released.

Her case helped garner legitimacy for the abuse defense, a concept virtually unknown at the time in criminal cases.

The case was the subject of a 2015 episode of Investigation Discovery's series A Crime to Remember.

Early life
She was born in Red Rock, Montana and raised in the nearby community of Dillon. She was trained to be a natural survivalist of the mountains. Prior to her marriage to Eric Madison, she had an annulment from a 23-year-old ex-convict when she was 13. She also later married and divorced three different men. She had no children.

Murder and conviction
On March 24, 1934 at their home in Burbank, California, after alleged repeated spousal abuse episodes by her husband Eric Madison, Nellie Madison pointed a gun at Eric while he was changing out of his day clothes with the intent on threatening him. He quickly reached under the bed for a box of butcher knives and allegedly threatened to cut her heart out. As he was reaching for a knife, Nellie shot Eric in the back five times, killing him.

Nellie Madison was later arrested and tried for the murder of her husband. Even before he knew all the facts, Los Angeles County District Attorney Buron Fitts sought the death penalty for Madison. On advice of her lawyers, Madison made no mention of the spousal abuse and claimed she was not at the scene of the murder. As her story was implausible, a jury convicted her and Judge Charles Fricke sentenced her to death. On appeal, the California Supreme Court upheld the conviction.

Appeal
After sentencing, Madison's ex-husband, with whom she was still friends, urged her to make the spousal abuse episodes public.

When pleading her case to Fricke, he refused to reduce the sentence and dismissed the allegations of domestic violence as "ridiculous."

But soon Madison began receiving public support, including from prominent journalist "Aggie" Underwood.  Underwood discovered that Eric Madison had beaten both Nellie and his ex-wife into signing a similar confession stating they were unfaithful in their marriage, when in fact, it was Eric who had been unfaithful and having affairs with teenage girls.

All of the jurors who convicted Madison petitioned Governor Frank Merriam to commute the sentence. In September 1935, Merriam commuted Madison's sentence to life in prison. After she waged a letter-writing campaign from prison to reduce her sentence, Governor Culbert Olson had Madison freed from prison on March 27, 1943, exactly nine years and three days after the murder.

Later life
In the fall of 1943, she settled in San Bernardino, where she married her sixth husband, house painter John Wagner.  It was her longest marriage. She died there on July 8, 1953 after a stroke.

References

1895 births
1953 deaths
American female murderers
American people convicted of murder
American prisoners sentenced to death
Incidents of domestic violence
People convicted of murder by California
Prisoners sentenced to death by California
Recipients of American gubernatorial clemency
People from Dillon, Montana
People from Burbank, California
People from San Bernardino, California
Mariticides